In taxonomy, the Thermoplasmata are a class of the Euryarchaeota.

All are acidophiles, growing optimally at pH below 2. Picrophilus is currently the most acidophilic of all known organisms growing at a minimum pH of 0.06. Many of these organisms do not contain a cell wall, although this is not true in the case of Picrophilus. Most members of Thermoplasmata are thermophilic.

Phylogeny
The currently accepted taxonomy is based on the List of Prokaryotic names with Standing in Nomenclature (LPSN) and National Center for Biotechnology Information (NCBI).

See also
 List of Archaea genera

References

Further reading

Scientific journals

Scientific books

Scientific databases

External links

Archaea classes
Euryarchaeota